The Whitmore Fire is a wildfire that started near Nespelem, Washington
on August 3, 2021. The fire has burned  and is 0% contained.

Events

June 
The Whitmore Fire was first reported on August 3, 2021, at 8:30 pm PDT.

Cause 
The cause of the fire is believed to be due to lightning.

Containment 
As of August 8, 2021, the fire is 0% percent contained.

Impact

Closures and Evacuations

See also 

 2021 Washington wildfires
 List of Washington wildfires

References 

Wildfires in Washington (state)
August 2021 events in the United States
2021 Washington (state) wildfires